Hemerophila diva, the Diva Hemerophila moth, is a moth in the family Choreutidae. It was described by Riley in 1889. It is found in Florida and Cuba.

The larvae feed on Ficus species, including Ficus citrifolia. They curl the leaves of their host plant and skeletonize the
surface.

References

Natural History Museum Lepidoptera generic names catalog

Choreutidae
Moths described in 1889